Mary Ellen Comes to Town is a 1920 American silent comedy film directed by Elmer Clifton and written by Wells Hastings and Helen G. Smith. The film stars Dorothy Gish, Kate Bruce, Ralph Graves, Adolph Lestina, Charles K. Gerrard, and Raymond Cannon. The film was released on March 21, 1920, by Paramount Pictures. It is not known whether the film currently survives.

Plot
As described in a film magazine, Mary Ellen (Gish) lives in a very small and unprogressive village, her entertainment being to watch the New York City train that passes through each day. A lucky chance gives her a card of introduction to a New York theatrical producer, and she goes to the city, innocently engaging as an entertainer at the Coster Cabaret, which is the headquarters of Willie the Weasel (Gerrard) and his band. The Weasel seeks to obtain the fortune recently inherited by Bob Fairacres (Graves), also of Mary Ellen's village, though she does not know it. The Weasel forces Mary Ellen to aid him by throwing suspicion of robbery on her. She carries through the plan to the critical moment when she tells Bob the truth, and they are saved when the police raid the cabaret. Bab and Mary Ellen return to their village and to happiness.

Cast
 Dorothy Gish as Mary Ellen
 Kate Bruce as Mary Ellen's mother
 Ralph Graves as Bob Fairacres
 Adolph Lestina as Col. Fairacres
 Charles K. Gerrard as William Gurson aka 'Will the Weasel'
 Raymond Cannon as 'Beauty' Bender
 Bert Appling as Hard Harris 
 Rhea Haines as Fossie Fleurette

References

External links 

 
 Lobby card at the Dorthy Gish Project
 Still at the Internet Movie Database

1920 films
Silent American comedy films
1920 comedy films
Paramount Pictures films
Films directed by Elmer Clifton
American black-and-white films
American silent feature films
1920s American films